The 1932 Arizona Wildcats football team represented the University of Arizona in the Border Conference during the 1932 college football season. In their first and only season under head coach Gus Farwick, the Wildcats compiled a 4–5 record (3–2 against Border opponents), finished in second place in the conference, and were outscored by their opponents, 106 to 82. The team captain was Bill Davies.  The team played its home games at Arizona Stadium in Tucson, Arizona.

Schedule

References

Arizona
Arizona Wildcats football seasons
Arizona Wildcats football